Alsos may refer to:

Places
Alsos Forest, a natural park in Nicosia, Cyprus
Alsos, Achaea, a village in the municipality of Sympoliteia in Achaea, Greece
Alsos Nea Smyrni
Alsos Veikou, a public park in Galatsi, in northern Athens, Greece
Alsos or Alysos, a rock in Meteora, Greece

People
Christel Alsos (born 1984), Norwegian singer

Other uses
Alsos Digital Library for Nuclear Issues
Alsos Mission, an effort by the British and United States during World War II